The Eyes of Nye is a science program that aired on public television in the United States in 2005 and featured Bill Nye. 
The show had an older target audience than its predecessor Bill Nye the Science Guy, aimed more toward adults and teenagers than children. The creation of the show was motivated by the success of Bill Nye the Science Guy, as well as a widespread contempt among scientists for scientific journalism in the media. The program was based in Seattle, Washington, produced by Buena Vista Television, and broadcast during primetime by KCTS, the local PBS affiliate.

Recurring segments
 Straight Talk: Parodies interview shows like Larry King Live.  The guest is always a deep-voiced, overbearing senator whose opinion fluctuates quite wildly with each question.
 Opinions Now with Chris David: Parodies "debate" shows like Hardball with Chris Matthews. The host is very loud, constantly leans forward and glares at the camera, and demands solid answers, or at least strong opinions, at all times.  Taking a jab at modern television news shows, the more level-headed and cautious experts are often ignored in favor of other guests with more extreme and livid views on the subject at hand.
 Science with Mr. Sanders: Parodies 1950s-era educational films. Mary and Tommy, stereotypical period schoolchildren, ask questions of their teacher, Mr. Sanders. The answers he gives are usually laden with his personal prejudices and disturbing information about his personal life. In a Twilight Zone–like twist, the characters imply that The Eyes of Nye is merely an educational film they are watching.
 The Hippy Couple: Parodies ignorant "New Agey" views on science, featuring a stereotypical hippy couple who ramble on at length about love, ecological produce, and global warming.  In the end, though, the couple really only appear to be interested in growing hemp, which seems plausible judging from their stoned appearance.

Episodes

History
Following the success of Bill Nye the Science Guy, Nye began work on a comeback project, The Eyes of Nye, aimed at an older audience and tackling more controversial science topics such as genetically modified food, global warming and race. However, "shifting creative concepts, infighting among executives and disputes over money with Seattle producing station KCTS" delayed production for years. KCTS was hampered by budgetary problems and couldn't produce a show pilot on time. "KCTS went through some distress", Nye recalled. "When we did The Eyes of Nye, the budget started out really big, and by the time we served all these little problems at KCTS, we had a much lower budget for the show than we'd ever had for the 'Science Guy' show which was made several years earlier." PBS declined to distribute The Eyes of Nye, and it was eventually picked up by American Public Television. "PBS wanted more serious, in-depth Nova-style shows", explained co-producer Randy Brinson.   The show, which eventually premiered in 2005, lasted only one season. Nye acknowledged that omitting his bow tie on the program was a mistake. "I tried wearing a straight tie. It was nothing", Nye said. "We were trying something new. It wasn't me."

Personnel
Bob Nelson and Pat Cashman, members of the sketch comedy television show Almost Live!, of which Bill Nye was also a member, made guest appearances. Cashman was also the voice of the announcer for Nye's previous show Bill Nye the Science Guy.  The show was directed by Emmy Award-winning, Steve Feldman and Almost Live! director & cast member Steve Wilson.

References

External links
 

2005 American television series debuts
2005 American television series endings
American educational television series
Bill Nye
English-language television shows
PBS original programming
PBS Kids shows
Science education television series
Television series by Disney–ABC Domestic Television